Caroline is an unincorporated census-designated place in the town of Grant in Shawano County, Wisconsin, United States. As of the 2010 census, its population is 270. The fire station for the town is located within the community. The community is located at the intersection of County Highways G & M between Marion and Tilleda. Caroline uses the ZIP code 54928. The Embarrass River passes through the community; it is used for ice racing.

Images

References

Census-designated places in Wisconsin
Census-designated places in Shawano County, Wisconsin